is a railway station operated by Kobe New Transit in Chūō-ku, Kobe, Japan. It is located on Port Island and is served by the Port Island Line.

Ridership

Gallery

Adjacent stations

References

External links
  

Railway stations in Japan opened in 1981
Railway stations in Kobe